Bayou Macon is a bayou in Arkansas and Louisiana. It begins in Desha County, Arkansas, and flows south, between the Boeuf River to its west and the Mississippi River to its east, before joining Joe's Bayou south of Delhi in Richland Parish, Louisiana.

The bayou area saw action during the American Civil War including from the 1st Regiment Kansas Volunteer Infantry in May 1863 in the areas then known as Caledonia and Pin Hook.

The Bayou Macon Wildlife Management Area comprises 6,919 acres in East Carroll Parish and was acquired by the Louisiana Department of Wildlife and Fisheries in 1991.

References

External links
Columbia Encyclopedia entry
 Bayou Macon watershed -- U.S. Environmental Protection Agency
 Bayou Macon watershed -- Arkansas Natural Resources Commission
 Bayou Macon Wildlife Management Area (Louisiana Dept. of Wildlife & Fisheries)

Rivers of Arkansas
Rivers of Louisiana
Tributaries of the Red River of the South
Rivers of Chicot County, Arkansas
Rivers of Desha County, Arkansas